Pau King Yin was a former professional footballer who plays as a goalkeeper. Born in British Hong Kong to ethnic Chinese parent, Pau represented Republic of China (Taiwan) in international level. After retirement he also coached Republic of China national team.

Pau was selected to Hong Kong Chinese official football team that toured Australia in 1953. However, he later withdrew from the team.

Honours

Republic of China
Asian Games Gold medal: 1954

References

Year of birth missing
1975 deaths
Hong Kong footballers
Taiwanese footballers
Hong Kong football managers
Taiwanese football managers
Hong Kong First Division League players
Chinese Taipei international footballers
Chinese Taipei national football team managers
Association football goalkeepers
Chinese Taipei international footballers from Hong Kong
Asian Games medalists in football
Asian Games gold medalists for Chinese Taipei
Footballers at the 1954 Asian Games
Medalists at the 1954 Asian Games